My Favorite Wife (released in the U.K. as My Favourite Wife) is a 1940 screwball comedy produced by Leo McCarey and directed by Garson Kanin.  The picture stars Irene Dunne as a woman who, after being shipwrecked on a tropical island for several years and declared legally dead, returns to her [former] husband (Cary Grant) and children. The story is an adaptation of Alfred, Lord Tennyson's 1864 poem, "Enoch Arden"; in tribute, the main characters' last name is Arden. The supporting cast features Gail Patrick as the woman Arden has just married when his first wife returns, and Randolph Scott as the man with whom his wife was marooned. My Favorite Wife was RKO's second-biggest hit of 1940.

Plot 
After seven years, lawyer Nick Arden has his wife Ellen, missing since her ship was lost, declared legally dead so he can marry Bianca.  Ellen, though, was actually shipwrecked on a deserted island, and has been rescued. When she returns home, she learns that Nick has just left on his honeymoon with his second wife.

When Ellen tracks him down before his honeymoon night, he is at a loss as to how to break the news to Bianca and continually puts off the unpleasant task. Meanwhile, Bianca becomes frustrated by Nick's odd behavior (especially the nonconsummation of their marriage) and calls in a psychiatrist, Dr. Kohlmar. Further complications ensue when an insurance adjuster mentions to Nick a rumor that Ellen was not alone on the island, but had the company of a Stephen Burkett, and that they called each other "Adam" and "Eve". When Nick confronts Ellen, she recruits a mousy shoe salesman to pretend to be Stephen, but Nick has already tracked down the real Stephen.

Nick tries to explain the situation to Bianca and Dr. Kohlmar, but they do not believe him, until he is arrested on a charge of bigamy. In court, Judge Bryson, the same judge who had Ellen declared legally dead and also married Nick and Bianca, annuls the second marriage. By this time, Ellen is no longer sure of Nick's feelings for her. Stephen asks her to marry him and return with him to the island, but she still loves Nick. In the end, Nick and Ellen are reconciled.

Cast

 Irene Dunne as Ellen Arden
 Cary Grant as Nick Arden
 Randolph Scott as Stephen Burkett
 Gail Patrick as Bianca Bates
 Ann Shoemaker as Ma, Nick's mother
 Scotty Beckett as Tim, the Ardens' son
 Mary Lou Harrington as Chinch, the Ardens' daughter
 Donald MacBride as Hotel clerk
 Hugh O'Connell as Johnson, the insurance adjuster
 Granville Bates as Judge Bryson
 Pedro de Cordoba as Dr. Kohlmar

Production
After the great success of The Awful Truth (1937), McCarey signed Cary Grant and Irene Dunne for the film without a script. He was to have directed My Favorite Wife, as well, but after his near-fatal car accident, Garson Kanin was assigned as director. "On My Favorite Wife," recalled Gail Patrick, "we were desperately trying to be funny as our producer, Leo McCarey, lay at death's door from an automobile crash. He recovered, but I never thought we entered into the spirit of that one. We couldn't—we were waiting for bulletins from the hospital." A number of pre-production conferences took place in the hospital, and McCarey recovered sufficiently to visit the set two or three weeks into filming.

When the shooting was finished, McCarey edited the film, and a preview was arranged. McCarey later recalled, "after about five reels, the picture took a dip, and for about two reels or more, it wasn't as funny as what preceded it ... it was a lot of unraveling of a tricky plot." A second preview confirmed that the film broke down at exactly the same point.

So the cast was dismissed, the writers went home, the director went back to New York, and I sat there with the cutter trying to figure out what to do to save the picture. ... Then I got the wildest idea I ever had. There was a judge in the opening who was very funny, and he dropped out of the picture, and I decided to bring him back. What we actually did was to tell the judge our story problems in the picture and have him comment on them. And it was truly great. It became the outstanding thing in the picture.

McCarey brought Kanin and one of the other writers back, and wrote the judge's dialogue himself—with help from Gail Patrick, who had studied law. One reel was shot and two or three were pulled. When the film was previewed again, it worked.

Patrick later said she felt that the resolution of the film should have included a romance between her character, Bianca, and Stephen Burkett (Randolph Scott). "I suggested that," Patrick said, "but the director [Garson Kanin] said I was going too far."

The honeymoon scenes take place in Yosemite National Park and were filmed at the Ahwahnee Hotel.

Reception
My Favorite Wife was RKO's second-biggest hit of 1940, after Kitty Foyle, earning a profit of $505,000.

The New York Sun described the film as "built for straight fun. It goes in for giggles, chuckles, and raised eyebrows....'My Favorite Wife' is gay, brittle, amusing farce."

"Both in theme and execution, My Favorite Wife was a quasisequel to The Awful Truth," wrote RKO studio chronicler Richard B. Jewell in 1982. "The film peaked about two-thirds of the way along and began to wear thin near the end, yet still contained a number of inspired scenes."

In 1991, Pauline Kael assessed My Favorite Wife as "the most famous and the funniest" modern version of Tennyson's story "Enoch Arden" (1864). She wrote "Garson Kanin was 27 (and at his liveliest) when he directed this screwball-classic hit".

Award nominations
Bella and Sam Spewak and Leo McCarey were nominated for the Academy Award for Best Story, Roy Webb for Best Score, and Van Nest Polglase and Mark-Lee Kirk for Best Art Direction.

Radio adaptations
My Favorite Wife was adapted for a 60-minute radio broadcast of Lux Radio Theater on December 9, 1940; Gail Patrick reprised her film role.  The March 23, 1941, broadcast of The Screen Guild Theater presented a 30-minute adaptation of the film, with Dunne reprising her role.  Four years later, on November 12, 1945, the same show presented another 30-minute adaptation, this time with Patrick once again reprising her role.

It was also adapted for the October 31, 1941, airing of Philip Morris Playhouse; Madeleine Carroll and Burgess Meredith starred in this adaptation. The broadcast does not survive in radio collections.

Grant and Dunne also reprised their roles when the movie was adapted for the December 7, 1950, broadcast of Screen Director's Playhouse.

Film remakes
20th Century Fox began filming a 1962 remake starring Marilyn Monroe, Dean Martin, and Cyd Charisse under the working title of Something's Got to Give, which was to be directed by George Cukor. Problems arose from the beginning, mostly due to Monroe's failure to show up on time for work. Monroe was fired and Martin backed out when the studio attempted to recast Monroe's role with Lee Remick. A recreation of surviving footage cobbled from the unfinished Something's Got to Give exists, along with some scenes reshot with Remick.

In 1963, 20th Century Fox remade the film as Move Over, Darling, starring Doris Day and James Garner.

Cary Grant's scene in the elevator—seeing his first wife, Irene Dunne—was repeated in "Move Over, Darling" and was remade in a similar scene of the 1998 film The Parent Trap, in which Dennis Quaid, in an elevator, sees his separated wife, Natasha Richardson.

See also
 Beyond (1921)
 Too Many Husbands, a 1940 romantic comedy film about a woman who loses her husband in a boating accident and remarries, only to have her first spouse reappear—yet another variation on the poem "Enoch Arden".
 Three for the Show, a 1955 musical comedy remake of Too Many Husbands, starring Betty Grable, Jack Lemmon, Gower Champion and Marge Champion

References

External links

 
 
 
 
 Historic reviews, photo gallery at CaryGrant.net

1940 films
1940 romantic comedy films
1940s screwball comedy films
American black-and-white films
American romantic comedy films
American screwball comedy films
Comedy of remarriage films
1940s English-language films
Films about polygamy
Films based on Enoch Arden
Films directed by Garson Kanin
Films scored by Roy Webb
RKO Pictures films
1940s American films